Peykar may refer to:
 Peykar or the Organization of Struggle for the Emancipation of the Working Class, a splinter group from the People's Mujahedin of Iran
 Peykar (1979 newspaper), an Iranian newspaper associated with the above group
 Peykar (1931 newspaper), a journal of the Communist Party of Persia
 Peykar Party, a 1940s Iranian nationalist organization